Peter Singleton Wilkes (1827 – January 2, 1900) was a prominent Confederate politician who served in the Confederate States Congress during the American Civil War.

Wilkes was born in Maury County, Tennessee and later moved to Missouri. He represented that state in the Second Confederate Congress from 1864 to 1865. After the war, he moved to California where he was the law partner of David S. Terry.

References

External links
Political Graveyard

Members of the Confederate House of Representatives from Missouri
19th-century American politicians
Missouri Democrats
People from Maury County, Tennessee
Missouri lawyers
California lawyers
1827 births
1900 deaths
19th-century American lawyers